Joseph Thomas Borowski (born May 4, 1971) is a sports broadcaster for the Arizona Diamondbacks, as well as a former professional baseball right-handed relief pitcher. He played in Major League Baseball for the Baltimore Orioles, Atlanta Braves, New York Yankees, Chicago Cubs, Tampa Bay Devil Rays, Florida Marlins, and Cleveland Indians.

Career

High school career
Borowski grew up in Bayonne, attended Marist High School and was an All-America selection in both football and baseball and a two-time All-State selection in both sports.  He attended Rutgers University in New Jersey.

Major League Baseball career
Borowski was a 32nd round draft pick of the Chicago White Sox in 1989. In 2000, Borowski pitched in the Mexican League for the Monterrey Sultanes and in the Northern League.

Before his second year with the Chicago  Cubs in 2002, Borowski had never appeared in more than 25 games, but when given a chance to appear frequently he did very well. Between his stints with the Yankees and Cubs, he worked as a fireman. In 2002, he went 4–4 with a 2.73 ERA in 73 games of relief. The next year, he was converted to the closer role for the Cubs and was exceptional, going 2–2 with a 2.63 ERA and recording 33 saves in 37 opportunities, helping the Cubs win their division and reach the NLCS before being eliminated by the eventual World Series champion Florida Marlins. In 2004, Borowski suffered from a partial tear in his right rotator cuff which limited him to just 22 games, in which he struggled, going 2–4 with an 8.02 ERA and recording 9 saves in 11 opportunities. In 2005, Borowski broke his hand on a come-backer that went directly at him. He returned to the Cubs on May 20. He did not have his old closer job back, though, as Ryan Dempster had emerged as the club's new closer. On June 29, 2005, Borowski was released by the Cubs.

Borowski was later in 2005 acquired by the Devil Rays, who use him as a set-up man to closer Danys Báez. While with the Devil Rays, Borowski got very hot, pitching a franchise record 21 scoreless innings, and is seen by many as the catalyst for the Devil Rays 2nd half turnaround, as his inspired performance helped stabilize the Rays' otherwise shaky bullpen. However, in his last 14 appearances he gave up 15 runs, and was designated for assignment by the Devil Rays in early December, and then released.

During the 2006 season, Borowski pitched for the Florida Marlins and converted 36 out of 43 save opportunities. On December 6, 2006, Borowski signed a $4.25 million, one-year contract to pitch for the Cleveland Indians that included a club option for 2008. The signing of Borowski filled the vacant closer role for Cleveland.

During the 2007 season, Borowski got off to a slow start as closer for the Indians, posting an earned run average of 13.50 in his first seven outings. His struggles were capped off after surrendering six runs to the New York Yankees on April 19, 2007, in the ninth inning after coming into the game with a 4-run lead. Borowski was not charged with a blown save in this outing, since a 3-run lead or smaller is required for a pitcher to earn the save. He led the American League with 45 saves, but had an of 5.07, which was the highest ever for a closer with 40 or more saves.

On November 6, 2007, the Indians exercised his $4 million club option, opting to bring him back in 2008.  Had the team declined Borowski's option, he would have been paid a $250,000 buyout.

In 2008, Borowski got off to a bad start to the season. Putting up an 18.00 ERA with two blown saves through 5 appearances, he averaged a walk, 2 hits, and 2 runs per appearance. Following another dreadful appearance in which he gave up 3 runs in  inning on April 14 the Indians put him on the 15-day DL with a strained triceps.

Borowski was designated for assignment by the Indians on July 4, and released on July 10, 2008.

On February 24, 2009, Borowski announced his retirement.

Personal life 
Borowski currently resides in Scottsdale, Arizona, with his wife Tatum and two sons Blaze and Ty. 

He accepted an award in 2004 from the Polish American Police Association as a distinguished Polish-American.

See also
 List of Major League Baseball annual saves leaders

References

External links
, or Mexican League, or Retrosheet, or The Baseball Gauge, or Venezuela Winter League

1971 births
Living people
Akron Aeros players
American expatriate baseball players in Mexico
American League saves champions
American people of Polish descent
Arizona Diamondbacks announcers
Atlanta Braves players
Baltimore Orioles players
Baseball players from New Jersey
Bowie Baysox players
Chicago Cubs players
Cleveland Indians players
Columbus Clippers players
Florida Marlins players
Frederick Keys players
Gulf Coast White Sox players
Iowa Cubs players
Kane County Cougars players
Lake County Captains players
Leones del Caracas players
American expatriate baseball players in Venezuela
Louisville RiverBats players
Major League Baseball broadcasters
Major League Baseball pitchers
Mexican League baseball pitchers
New York Yankees players
Newark Bears players
Sportspeople from Bayonne, New Jersey
Richmond Braves players
Rochester Red Wings players
Rutgers Scarlet Knights baseball players
Sportspeople from Hudson County, New Jersey
Sultanes de Monterrey players
Tampa Bay Devil Rays players